Nungesser may refer to:

People
 Charles Nungesser, French pilot
 Billy Nungesser, Lieutenant Governor of Louisiana since 2016
 William "Billy" Nungesser, Louisiana Republican politician, father of Billy Nungesser

Places
Nungessers in northeastern New Jersey
Nungesser Lake in Ontario, Canada